A digital lollipop is an electronic device that synthesizes virtual tastes by stimulating the human tongue with electric currents. The device can produce four primary tastes: sweet, sour, salty, and bitter. Digital lollipops were developed through research led by Nimesha Ranasinghe at the National University of Singapore.

Design 

According to Ranasinghe, "The system can manipulate the properties of electric currents (magnitude, frequency, and polarity: inverse current) to formulate different stimuli. Currently, we are conducting experiments to analyze regional differences of the human tongue for electrical stimulation."

The devices generate alternating current signals through a sliver electrode, stimulating the tongue's taste receptors to emulate the major taste components. It also produces small, varying amounts of heat to simulate food.

Eventually, the digital lollipop could aid Alzheimer's patients by helping them "either enhance or suppress certain senses". It may also allow people with diabetes to experience sweetness without increasing their blood sugar levels. The National University of Singapore research team is developing Taste Over Internet Protocol (TOIP) that would allow taste information to be communicated between locations.

See also
 Virtual reality
 Gustatory technology

References

Further reading
 Nimesha Ranasinghe, Hideaki Nii, Adrian Cheok, Ryohei Nakatsu, Ponnampalam Gopalakrishnakone, Digital Taste Lollipop: Studying Electrical Stimulation on Human Tongue to Simulate the Sensation of Taste, International Journal of Human-Computer Studies (Elsevier), Jan 2013
 Nimesha Ranasinghe, Ryohei Nakatsu, Nii Hideaki, and Ponnampalam Gopalakrishnakone, Tongue Mounted Interface for Digitally Actuating the Sense of Taste, in Proceedings of the 16th International Symposium on Wearable Computers (ISWC), June 2012, pp. 80–87. ,

External links
 Digital lollipop at Nimesha Ranasinghe's website
 Video of the digital lollipop in use

Digital electronics
Flavor technology